The African gecko (Ancylodactylus africanus) is a species of gecko found in Central Africa. Two subspecies have been described.

References 

 Werner, F. 1896 Über einige Reptilien aus Usambara (Deutsch-Ostafrika). Verhandlungen der Kaiserlich-Königlichen Zoologisch-Botanischen Gesellschaft in Wien, 45 [1895]:190-194.
 Rösler, H. 2000 Kommentierte Liste der rezent, subrezent und fossil bekannten Geckotaxa (Reptilia: Gekkonomorpha). Gekkota 2: 28-153
 Perret J L 1986 Revision des espèces africaines du genre Cnemaspis Strauch, sous-genre Ancylodactylus Muller (Lacertilia, Gekkonidae), avec la description de quatre espèces nouvelles. Revue Suisse de Zoologie 93 (2) 1986: 457-505
 Broadley, D. G. & Howell, K. M. 1991 A check list of the reptiles of Tanzania, with synoptic keys. Syntarsus, 1: 1-70
 Bauer,A.M. & Günther,R. 1991 An annotated type catalogue of the geckos (Reptilia: Gekkonidae) in the Zoological Museum, Berlin. Mitt. Zool. Mus. Berlin 67: 279-310
 Atlas de la terrariophile Vol.3 : les lézards. Animalia Éditions, 2003. 

Ancylodactylus
Reptiles described in 1895